The Billboard Top Latin Songs chart ranks the best-performing Spanish-language singles in the United States. Published by Billboard magazine, the data are compiled by Nielsen SoundScan based collectively on each single's weekly physical and digital sales, and airplay.

Chart history

References

External links
Current Hot Latin Songs Chart

United States Latin Songs
2011
2011 in Latin music